There are at least 13 named lakes and reservoirs in Sevier County, Arkansas.

Lakes
Berks Slough, el.  
Johnson Lake, el.  
 Red Lake, el.  
 Russey Lake, el.

Reservoirs
Coulter Lake, el.  
De Queen Lake, el.  
Dierks Lake, el.  
Double K Lake, el.  
Fraser Pond, el.  
Gillham Lake, el.  
Lake Hospitality, el.  
Process City Lake, el.  
Tobin Lake, el.

See also
 List of lakes in Arkansas

Notes

Bodies of water of Sevier County, Arkansas
Sevier